Aránzazu Gallardo (born 30 September 1973) is a former professional tennis player from Mexico.

Biography
Gallardo appeared in six Federation Cup ties for Mexico, between 1989 and 1991.

On the professional tour, Gallardo reached a best singles ranking of 324 and featured in the main draw of the Aurora Classic WTA Tour tournament in 1991, where she was beaten in the first round by Anne Minter.

At the 1991 Pan American Games in Havana she partnered with Isabela Petrov to win a bronze medal in the women's doubles.

ITF finals

Singles (1–3)

Doubles (2–2)

References

External links
 
 
 

1973 births
Living people
Mexican female tennis players
Tennis players at the 1991 Pan American Games
Pan American Games medalists in tennis
Pan American Games bronze medalists for Mexico
Central American and Caribbean Games medalists in tennis
Central American and Caribbean Games gold medalists for Mexico
Medalists at the 1991 Pan American Games
20th-century Mexican women